Ingeburg Schwerzmann ( Althoff, born 2 June 1967 in Münster) is a German rower. She married the Swiss rower Beat Schwerzmann at the end of 1991 and competed from the 1992 rowing season under her married name.

References 
 
 

1967 births
Living people
German female rowers
Sportspeople from Münster
Olympic rowers of Germany
Rowers at the 1988 Summer Olympics
Rowers at the 1992 Summer Olympics
Olympic silver medalists for Germany
Olympic medalists in rowing
Medalists at the 1992 Summer Olympics
World Rowing Championships medalists for West Germany
World Rowing Championships medalists for Germany
20th-century German women
21st-century German women